A front-engine, rear-wheel-drive layout (FR) is an automotive design with an engine in front  and rear-wheel-drive, connected via a drive shaft. This arrangement, with the engine straddling the front axle, was the traditional automobile layout for most of the 20th century.It is also used in trucks, pickups, and high-floor buses and school buses. 

The FR layout was largely displaced in the late 20th century by the front-engine, front-wheel-drive (FF) and all-wheel drive (AWD) layouts.

Front mid-engine, rear-wheel-drive layout

A front mid-engine, rear-wheel-drive layout (FMR) places the engine in the front of the vehicle but behind the front axle, which likewise drives the rear wheels via a driveshaft. Shifting the engine's center of mass rearward aids in front/rear weight distribution and reduces the moment of inertia, both of which improve a vehicle's handling. 

FMR cars are often characterized by a long hood and front wheels that are pushed forward to the corners of the vehicle, close to the front bumper. 2+2-style grand tourers often have FMR layouts, as a rear engine does not leave much space for rear seats.

Gallery

See also 
Weissach axle

References 

Car layouts